Mārcis Rullis (born 31 January 1979) is a Latvian bobsledder. He competed at the 2002 Winter Olympics and the 2006 Winter Olympics.

References

External links
 

1979 births
Living people
Latvian male bobsledders
Olympic bobsledders of Latvia
Bobsledders at the 2002 Winter Olympics
Bobsledders at the 2006 Winter Olympics
People from Valka